
Gmina Szczuczyn is an urban-rural gmina (administrative district) in Grajewo County, Podlaskie Voivodeship, in north-eastern Poland.

Villages
Apart from the town of Szczuczyn, Gmina Szczuczyn contains the villages and settlements of Balcer, Bęćkowo, Brzeźno, Bzury, Chojnowo, Czarnówek, Czarnowo, Danowo, Dołęgi, Gutki, Jambrzyki, Koniecki Małe, Koniecki-Rostroszewo, Kurki, Lipnik, Mazewo, Miętusewo, Milewo, Niećkowo, Niedźwiadna, Niedźwiedzkie, Nowe Zacieczki, Obrytki, Przeszkoda, Rakowo, Skaje, Sokoły, Stare Guty, Świdry-Awissa, Tarachy, Wólka, Zacieczki, Załuski, and Zofiówka.

Neighbouring gminas
Gmina Szczuczyn is bordered by the gminas of Biała Piska, Grabowo, Grajewo, Prostki, and Wąsosz.

References

Polish official population figures 2006

External links
Jewish community of Szczuczyn

Szczuczyn
Grajewo County